The 2016–17 season was Sheffield United's 128th season in their history and their sixth consecutive season in League One. It was manager and boyhood Blade Chris Wilder’s first season in charge, with the Blades accumulating 100 points, promoting them as champions to the Championship. Along with League One, the club also competed in the FA Cup, EFL Cup and EFL Trophy. The season covers the period from 1 July 2016 to 30 June 2017.

Squad

Statistics

|-
|colspan=14|Out on Loan:

|-
|colspan=14|Players who left the club during the season:

|}

Goals record

Disciplinary record

Transfers

Transfers in

Transfers out

Loans in

Loans out

Competitions

Pre-season friendlies

EFL League One

League table

Matches

FA Cup

EFL Cup

EFL Trophy

References

Sheffield United F.C. seasons
Sheffield United